The scaly hairfin anchovy (Setipinna taty) is a species of ray-finned fish in the family Engraulidae. It is found in coastal waters and estuaries in the tropical western Indo-Pacific region.

References

Anchovies
Fish of Thailand
Taxa named by Achille Valenciennes
Fish described in 1848